Chapel House is a suburban housing estate in the outer west of Newcastle upon Tyne, England that was built by Bellway in 1964. Made up of private  properties,  it is approximately  directly from the city centre.  It is bordered by Chapel Park, Westerhope, West Denton, Blucher as well as Abbey Farm estate and Abbey Grange estate.
Before 2005, Chapel House estate had a large middle school named Chapel House Middle School which catered for about 500 children in the area and beyond.  However, this closed in 2005 when the outer west of Newcastle switched to two tier education.
Similarly, Knoplaw Primary School and Milecastle Primary School (also within Chapel House) used to be first schools. 
Chapel House Middle School's land has been built on and now houses Knoplaw Primary School. A silverspade event was held on 7 July 2009.
Thomas Bewick School and Walbottle Campus Lower School are no-longer situated there.

A campaign by local residents in 2011 led to the protection of Chadderton Field from planned development.  It thus became only the second village green to be registered in the city, under the Commons Act, 2006.

Chapel House has a range of buses, (Service Number 40,63,72 and 38A) which enables people to get to the city centre within 35 minutes.  There are 5 bus stops in the area as well as 3 bus routes each headed to the city centre. All services are provided by Stagecoach In Newcastle & all designated routes for low floor kneeling buses.

There are, however, local shops as well as 2 churches, 2 doctor's practices and a dentist.

External links
Chapel House Holy Nativity
Westerhope Ward
 Westerhope Online: Community & Radio

References

Districts of Newcastle upon Tyne